Hope Township may refer to:

Canada
 Hope Township, Ontario, now Port Hope

United States
Illinois
 Hope Township, LaSalle County, Illinois

Kansas
 Hope Township, Dickinson County, Kansas

Michigan
 Hope Township, Barry County, Michigan
 Hope Township, Midland County, Michigan

Minnesota
 Hope Township, Lincoln County, Minnesota

New Jersey
 Hope Township, New Jersey

North Dakota
 Hope Township, Cavalier County, North Dakota, in Cavalier County, North Dakota
 Hope Township, Ramsey County, North Dakota, in Ramsey County, North Dakota

Township name disambiguation pages